Hieronymus Brunschwig or Hieronymus Brunschwygk (c. 1450c. 1512) was a German surgeon ("Wundarzt"), alchemist and botanist. He was notable for his methods of treatment of gunshot wounds and for his early work on distillation techniques. His most influential book was the Liber de arte distillandi de simplicibus (also called Kleines Destillierbuch).

Life
Brunschwig was born c. 1450 in the free imperial city of Strasbourg, which in his time was part of the Holy Roman Empire. Some notes in his Buch der cirurgia may suggest, that he studied in Bologna, Padua and Paris and that he participated in the Burgundian Wars, but all this is utterly unfounded. He settled at Strasbourg at the end of the fifteenth century. He died in Strasbourg, c. 1512.

Publications

1497: Das buch der cirurgia: hantwirckung der wundarztny.
 Reprints: Strasbourg 1513 - Rostock 1518 in Low German - Augsburg 1534 - Munich 1911, 1968 - Milan - 1923.
 Translations: 1) In English by Peter Treveris in London. 1525. 2) In Dutch by Jan Berents in Utrecht. 1535.

1500 (08.05.): Liber de arte distillandi de simplicibus. (= Kleines Destillierbuch)
Reprints of the Liber de arte distillandi de simplicibus were contained in the reprints of Medicinarius (see below) starting from 1505. Moreover the Liber de arte distillandi de simplicibus was merged with the Gart der Gesundheit (Mainz 1485) into the Kräuterbuch von allem Erdgewächs of Eucharius Rösslin the Younger. (Frankfurt 1533, 1535, 1536, 1538, 1540, 1542 and 1546).
 Translations : 1) In Dutch  by Thomas van der Noot in Brussels. 1517. 2) In English by Lawrence Andrew in London 1527. 3) In Czech by Jan Günther in Olmütz. 1559.

1500 (19.08.): Liber pestilentialis de venenis epidemie.
1505: Medicinarius.
Containing :
the Liber de arte distillandi de simplicibus. (Kleines Destillierbuch),
the treatise De vita libri tres of Marsilio Ficino (translated into German by Johann Adelphi of Strasbourg),
Glossaries of drugs names,
a treatise called De Quinta essentia which was largely influenced by the book De consideratione quintae essentiae of Jean de Roquetaillade.
Reprints: Strasbourg 1508, 1515, 1521, 1528, 1531,1537 ; Frankfurt 1551, 1554, 1555, 1560, 1610, 1614.

1512: Liber de arte distillandi de compositis. (= Großes Destillierbuch)
 Containing :
  a book about « Quinta essentia » and other alchemical drugs – with long passages taken out of the book De consideratione quintae essentiae of Jean de Roquetaillade,
 an enumeration of simplicia (medicines, composed by one single drug) and composita (medicines, composed by several drugs) – according to the character of diseases,  
  an enumeration of simplicia  and composita – according to the location of diseases (from head to feet),
 an enumeration of simplicia  and composita – for use in surgical practice and
 a treatise intitled « Thesaurus pauperum » - dispensatory in 45 chapters, containing cheap medicines for the poor. 
 The « Thesaurus pauperum » was separately reprinted 
1) under the titles Hausapotheke or Hausarzneibüchlein. (39 reprints. 1537 -1658). 
2) under the title Apotheke für den gemeinen Mann together with the Büchlein von den ausgebrannten Wässern, which was ascribed to Michael Puff. (30 reprints. 1529-1619).
Reprints of the whole Liber de arte distillandi de compositis: Strasbourg 1519, 1532 ; Frankfurt 1538, 1551, 1552, 1597; Leipzig 1972.

Liber de arte distillandi de simplicibus 

The Liber de arte distillandi de simplicibus (1500) was the earliest printed book dealing with the techniques of distillation from herbal and animal substances. It consisted of three parts:
 A detailed description of the methods and apparati, showing influences from Jean de Roquetaillades‘ book De consideratione quintae essentiae. The name of distillation was given by the alchemists not only to the procedure that is nowadays called distillation, but as well to methods like „filtration“ and „circulation“ that were interpreted as methods of „de-stillatio (dropping down)“.
 An enumeration of herbal and animal substances in alphabetical order with botanical remarks on indigenous plants, based on Brunschwigs‘ own observations. This was followed by the enumeration of indications of the „distilled” medicines. These indications were based as well on the writings in the textbooks of old tradition (Dioscorides …) as on prescriptions of folk medicine. The „Büchlein von den ausgebrannten Wässern“, ascribed to Michael Puff of Vienna and recipes in manuscripts of the 15th century were Brunschwigs‘ main sources.
 A list of maladies „from head to feet“, with reference to the prescriptions given in the second part.

As the last of the fifteenth-century herbals, the Liber de arte distillandi de simplicibus is widely regarded to be an important link between the Middle Ages and modern times. Due to its in-depth description and many illustrations of distillation apparati and techniques, the book was considered to be an authoritative text well into the 16th century.

Otto Brunfels and Hieronymus Bock, both called „fathers of botany“ („Väter der Botanik“) in honour of their truthful description of indigenous plants, respected Brunschwig as their predecessor. Leonhard Fuchs, the third of the „fathers of botany“, did not mention Brunschwig at all.

References 
 Agnes Arber. Herbals. Their origin and evolution. A chapter in the history of botany. 1470-1670. Univ. Press, Cambridge 1912.
 Hermann Fischer. Mittelalterliche Pflanzenkunde. München 1929, p. 109-113: Das kleine Destillierbuch des Hieronymus Brunschwig.
 Henry E. Sigerist. Hieronymus Brunschwig and his work. Anhang zu: The book of Cirurgia by Hieronymus Brunschwig. R. Lier, Milano 1923.
 Eleanor Sinclair Rohde. The old English herbals. Minerva, London 1922.
 Karl Sudhoff. Deutsche medizinische Inkunabeln. Bibliographisch-literarische Untersuchungen. J.A. Barth, Leipzig 1908.

Notes

External links

Das buch der cirurgia : hantwirckung der wuntartzny. 1497.  Digitalisat
Liber de arte distillandi de simplicibus. 1500. Digitalisat The vertuose boke of Distillacyon 1527. Digitalisat
Liber pestilentialis de venenis epidemie. 1500. Digitalisat
Medicinarius. 1505. Digitalisat
Liber de arte distillandi de compositis. 1512. Digitalisat Hausapotheke. Augsburg 1545. Digitalisat )* *Apoteck für den gemeinen man. 1529. Digitalisat

1450s births
1510s deaths
Date of birth unknown
Date of death unknown
16th-century German physicians
Physicians from Strasbourg
15th-century German writers
16th-century German writers
16th-century German male writers
15th-century German physicians
16th-century surgeons